The Snow Mountains robin (Petroica archboldi), also known as the Snow Mountain robin, is a species of bird in the family Petroicidae.  It is endemic to West Papua, Indonesia.

References

Petroica
Birds of Western New Guinea
Birds described in 1940
Taxa named by Austin L. Rand
Taxonomy articles created by Polbot